Moses ben Maimon (1138–1204), commonly known as Maimonides and also referred to by the acronym Rambam, was a Sephardic Jewish philosopher who became one of the most prolific and influential Torah scholars of the Middle Ages. In his time, he was also a preeminent astronomer and physician, serving as the personal physician of Saladin. Born in Córdoba, Almoravid Empire (present-day Spain), on Passover eve, 1138 (or 1135), he worked as a rabbi, physician and philosopher in Morocco and Egypt. He died in Egypt on 12 December 1204, his body was transported to the lower Galilee and was eventually buried in Tiberias.

During his lifetime, most Jews greeted Maimonides' writings on Jewish law and ethics with acclaim and gratitude, even as far away as Iraq and Yemen. Yet, while Maimonides rose to become the revered head of the Jewish community in Egypt, his writings also had vociferous critics, particularly in Spain. Nonetheless, he was posthumously acknowledged as one of the foremost rabbinic decisors and philosophers in Jewish history, and his copious work comprises a cornerstone of Jewish scholarship. His fourteen-volume  still carries significant canonical authority as a codification of Halacha. He is sometimes known as הנשר הגדול ( The Great Eagle) in recognition of his outstanding status as a bona fide exponent of the Oral Torah.

Aside from being revered by Jewish historians, Maimonides also figures very prominently in the history of Islamic and Arab sciences and he is mentioned extensively in studies. Influenced by Aristotle, Al-Farabi, Ibn Sina, and his contemporary Ibn Rushd, he became a prominent philosopher and polymath in both the Jewish and Islamic worlds.

Name
Maimonides referred to himself as משה בירבי מימון הספרדי, Hebrew for "Moshe son of Rabbi Maimon, the Spaniard". In Medieval Hebrew he was usually called ר"ם, short for "our Rabbi Moshe" and in Modern Hebrew he is called רמב"ם, short for "our Rabbi Moshe son of Maimon" and pronounced Rambam. 

In Arabic, he is sometimes called "Moses 'son of Amram' son of Maimon, of Obadiah, the Cordoban" (Abū ʿImrān Mūsā bin Maimūn bin ʿUbaidallāh al-Qurṭubī), or more often Mūsā bin Maymūn. 

In Greek, the Hebrew  ('son of') becomes the patronymic suffix , forming Μωησής Μαϊμονίδης "Moses Maimonides".

Biography

Early years

Maimonides was born 1138 (or 1135) in Córdoba, Andalusia, in the Muslim-ruled Almoravid Empire, during what some scholars consider to be the end of the golden age of Jewish culture in the Iberian Peninsula, after the first centuries of the Moorish rule. His father Maimon ben Joseph, was a Spanish dayyan (Jewish judge), whose family claimed direct paternal descent from Simeon ben Judah ha-Nasi, and thus from the Davidic line. Maimonides later stated that there are 38 generations between him and Judah ha-Nasi. His ancestry, going back four generations, is given in his  (Epistle to Yemen), as Moses son of Maimon the Judge, son of Joseph the Wise, son of Isaac the Rabbi, son of Obadiah the Judge. At the end of his commentary on the Mishna, however, a slightly different genealogy is presented: Moses son of Maimon the Judge, son of Joseph the Wise, son of Rabbi Isaac the Judge, son of Joseph the Judge, son of Obadiah the Judge, son of Solomon the Teacher, son of Obadiah the Judge.

Maimonides studied Torah under his father, who had in turn studied under Rabbi Joseph ibn Migash, a student of Isaac Alfasi. At an early age, Maimonides developed an interest in sciences and philosophy. He read those Greek philosophers accessible in Arabic translations, and was deeply immersed in the sciences and learning of Islamic culture.

Maimonides, who was revered for his personality as well as for his writings, led a busy life, and wrote many of his works while travelling or in temporary accommodation.

Exile

A Berber dynasty, the Almohads, conquered Córdoba in 1148 and abolished  status (i.e., state protection of non-Muslims ensured through payment of a tax, the ) in some of their territories. The loss of this status left the Jewish and Christian communities with conversion to Islam, death, or exile. Many Jews were forced to convert, but due to suspicion by the authorities of fake conversions, the new converts had to wear identifying clothing that set them apart and made them subject to public scrutiny.

Maimonides's family, along with most other Jews, chose exile. The question whether Maimonides himself was among those who had to convert to Islam in order to save his life prior to fleeing the area, has been the subject of scholarly debate. This forced conversion was ruled legally invalid under Islamic law when brought up by a rival in Egypt. For the next ten years, Maimonides moved about in southern Spain, eventually settling in Fez in Morocco. During this time, he composed his acclaimed commentary on the Mishnah, during the years 1166–1168. Some say that his teacher in Fez was Rabbi Yehuda Ha-Cohen Ibn Susan, until he was killed in 1165.

Following this sojourn in Morocco, together with two sons, he sojourned in Palestine before settling in Fustat in Fatimid Caliphate-controlled Egypt around 1168. There is mention that Maimonides first settled in Alexandria, and moved to Fustat only in 1171.  While in Cairo, he studied in a yeshiva attached to a small synagogue, which now bears his name. In Palestine, he prayed at the Temple Mount. He wrote that this day of visiting the Temple Mount was a day of holiness for him and his descendants.

Maimonides shortly thereafter was instrumental in helping rescue Jews taken captive during the Christian Amalric of Jerusalem's siege of the southeastern Nile Delta town of Bilbeis. He sent five letters to the Jewish communities of Lower Egypt asking them to pool money together to pay the ransom. The money was collected and then given to two judges sent to Palestine to negotiate with the Crusaders. The captives were eventually released.

Death of his brother

Following this triumph, the Maimonides family, hoping to increase their wealth, gave their savings to his brother, the youngest son David ben Maimon, a merchant. Maimonides directed his brother to procure goods only at the Sudanese port of ʽAydhab. After a long arduous trip through the desert, however, David was unimpressed by the goods on offer there. Against his brother's wishes, David boarded a ship for India, since great wealth was to be found in the East. Before he could reach his destination, David drowned at sea sometime between 1169 and 1177. The death of his brother caused Maimonides to become sick with grief.

In a letter discovered in the Cairo Geniza, he wrote:

Nagid

Arabist Shelomo Dov Goitein believes the leadership he displayed during the ransoming of the Crusader captives led to this appointment. However he was replaced by Sar Shalom ben Moses in 1173. Over the controversial course of Sar Shalom's appointment, during which Sar Shalom was accused of tax farming, Maimonides excommunicated and fought with him for several years until Maimonides was appointed Nagid in 1195. A work known as "Megillat Zutta" was written by Abraham ben Hillel, who writes a scathing description of Sar Shalom while praising Maimonides as "the light of east and west and unique master and marvel of the generation."

Physician

With the loss of the family funds tied up in David's business venture, Maimonides assumed the vocation of physician, for which he was to become famous. He had trained in medicine in both Córdoba and in Fez. Gaining widespread recognition, he was appointed court physician to al-Qadi al-Fadil, the chief secretary to Sultan Saladin, then to Saladin himself; after whose death he remained a physician to the Ayyubid dynasty.

In his medical writings, Maimonides described many conditions, including asthma, diabetes, hepatitis, and pneumonia, and he emphasized moderation and a healthy lifestyle. His treatises became influential for generations of physicians. He was knowledgeable about Greek and Arabic medicine, and followed the principles of humorism in the tradition of Galen. He did not blindly accept authority but used his own observation and experience. Julia Bess Frank indicates that Maimonides in his medical writings sought to interpret works of authorities so that they could become acceptable. Maimonides displayed in his interactions with patients attributes that today would be called intercultural awareness and respect for the patient's autonomy. Although he frequently wrote of his longing for solitude in order to come closer to God and to extend his reflections – elements considered essential in his philosophy to the prophetic experience – he gave over most of his time to caring for others. In a famous letter, Maimonides describes his daily routine. After visiting the Sultan's palace, he would arrive home exhausted and hungry, where "I would find the antechambers filled with gentiles and Jews […] I would go to heal them, and write prescriptions for their illnesses […] until the evening […] and I would be extremely weak."

As he goes on to say in this letter, even on Shabbat he would receive members of the community. It is remarkable that he managed to write extended treatises, including not only medical and other scientific studies but some of the most systematically thought-through and influential treatises on halakha (rabbinic law) and Jewish philosophy of the Middle Ages.

Joseph Karo later praised Maimonides, writing of him, "Maimonides is the greatest of the decisors [of Jewish law], and all communities of the Land of Israel and of Arabia and of the Maghreb base their practices after him, and have taken him upon themselves as their rabbi."

In 1172–74, Maimonides wrote his famous Epistle to Yemen. It has been suggested that his "incessant travail" undermined his own health and brought about his death at 69 (although this is a normal lifespan).

Death

Maimonides died on 12 December 1204 (20th of Tevet 4965) in Fustat. A variety of medieval sources beginning with Al-Qifti maintain that his body was interred near Lake Tiberias, though there is no contemporary evidence for his removal from Egypt. Today, Tiberias hosts the Tomb of Maimonides, on which is inscribed "From Moses to Moses arose none like Moses."

Maimonides and his wife, the daughter of Mishael ben Yeshayahu Halevi, had one child who survived into adulthood, Abraham Maimonides, who became recognized as a great scholar. He succeeded Maimonides as Nagid and as court physician at the age of eighteen. Throughout his career, he defended his father's writings against all critics. The office of Nagid was held by the Maimonides family for four successive generations until the end of the 14th century.

A statue of Maimonides was erected near the Córdoba Synagogue.

Maimonides is sometimes said to be a descendant of King David, although he never made such a claim.

Works

Mishneh Torah

With , Maimonides composed a code of Jewish law with the widest-possible scope and depth. The work gathers all the binding laws from the Talmud, and incorporates the positions of the Geonim (post-Talmudic early Medieval scholars, mainly from Mesopotamia).

Later codes of Jewish law, e.g. Arba'ah Turim by Rabbi Jacob ben Asher and Shulchan Aruch by Rabbi Yosef Karo, draw heavily on : both often quote whole sections verbatim. However, it met initially with much opposition. There were two main reasons for this opposition. First, Maimonides had refrained from adding references to his work for the sake of brevity; second, in the introduction, he gave the impression of wanting to "cut out" study of the Talmud, to arrive at a conclusion in Jewish law, although Maimonides later wrote that this was not his intent. Nevertheless, Mishneh Torah was recognized as a monumental contribution to the systemized writing of halakha. Throughout the centuries, it has been widely studied and its halakhic decisions have weighed heavily in later rulings.

In response to those who would attempt to force followers of Maimonides and his  to abide by the rulings of his own Shulchan Aruch or other later works, Rabbi Yosef Karo wrote: "Who would dare force communities who follow the Rambam to follow any other decisor, early or late? […] The Rambam is the greatest of the decisors, and all the communities of the Land of Israel and the Arabistan and the Maghreb practice according to his word, and accepted him as their rabbi."

An oft-cited legal maxim from his pen is: "It is better and more satisfactory to acquit a thousand guilty persons than to put a single innocent one to death." He argued that executing a defendant on anything less than absolute certainty would lead to a slippery slope of decreasing burdens of proof, until defendants would be convicted merely according to the judge's caprice.

Other Judaic and philosophical works

Maimonides composed works of Jewish scholarship, rabbinic law, philosophy, and medical texts. Most of Maimonides's works were written in Judeo-Arabic. In addition to Mishneh Torah, his Jewish texts were:
 Commentary on the Mishna (Arabic , translated into Hebrew as ), written in Classical Arabic using the Hebrew alphabet. This was the first full commentary ever written on the entire Mishnah, which took Maimonides seven years to complete. It is considered one of the most important Mishnah commentaries, having enjoyed great popularity both in its Arabic original and its medieval Hebrew translation. The commentary includes three philosophical introductions which were also highly influential:
 The Introduction to the Mishnah deals with the nature of the oral law, the distinction between the prophet and the sage, and the organizational structure of the Mishnah.
 The Introduction to Mishnah Sanhedrin, chapter ten, is an eschatological essay that concludes with Maimonides's famous creed ("the thirteen principles of faith").
 The Introduction to Pirkei Avot, popularly called The Eight Chapters, is an ethical treatise.
  (The Book of Commandments). In this work, Maimonides lists all the 613 mitzvot traditionally contained in the Torah (Pentateuch). He describes fourteen  (roots or principles) to guide his selection.
  (Letter of Martydom)
 The Guide for the Perplexed, a philosophical work harmonising and differentiating Aristotle's philosophy and Jewish theology. Written in Judeo-Arabic, and completed between 1186 and 1190. The first translation of this work into Hebrew was done by Samuel ibn Tibbon in 1204.
 , collected correspondence and responsa, including a number of public letters (on resurrection and the afterlife, on conversion to other faiths, and  – addressed to the oppressed Jewry of Yemen).
 , a fragment of a commentary on the Jerusalem Talmud, identified and published by Saul Lieberman in 1947.

Medical works
Maimonides' achievements in the medical field are well known, and are cited by many medieval authors. One of his more important medical works is his Guide to Good Health, which he composed in Arabic for the Sultan al-Afdal, son of Saladin, who suffered from depression. The work was translated into Latin, and published in Florence in 1477, becoming the first medical book to appear in print there. While his prescriptions may have become obsolete, "his ideas about preventive medicine, public hygiene, approach to the suffering patient, and the preservation of the health of the soul have not become obsolete." Maimonides wrote ten known medical works in Arabic that have been translated by the Jewish medical ethicist Fred Rosner into contemporary English. Lectures, conferences and research on Maimonides, even recently in the 21st century, have been done at medical universities in Morocco.
, Suessmann Muntner (ed.), Mossad Harav Kook: Jerusalem 1963 (translated into Hebrew by Moshe Ibn Tibbon)
 The Art of Cure – Extracts from Galen (Barzel, 1992, Vol. 5) is essentially an extract of Galen's extensive writings.
 Commentary on the Aphorisms of Hippocrates (Rosner, 1987, Vol. 2;) is interspersed with his own views.
 Medical Aphorisms of Moses (Rosner, 1989, Vol. 3) titled Fusul Musa in Arabic ("Chapters of Moses,) contains 1500 aphorisms and many medical conditions are described.
 Treatise on Hemorrhoids (in Rosner, 1984, Vol. 1;) discusses also digestion and food.
 Treatise on Cohabitation (in Rosner, 1984, Vol. 1) contains recipes as aphrodisiacs and anti-aphrodisiacs.
 Treatise on Asthma (Rosner, 1994, Vol. 6) discusses climates and diets and their effect on asthma and emphasizes the need for clean air.
 Treatise on Poisons and Their Antidotes (in Rosner, 1984, Vol. 1) is an early toxicology textbook that remained popular for centuries.
 Regimen of Health (in Rosner, 1990, Vol. 4;) is a discourse on healthy living and the mind-body connection.
 Discourse on the Explanation of Fits advocates healthy living and the avoidance of overabundance.
 Glossary of Drug Names (Rosner, 1992, Vol. 7) represents a pharmacopeia with 405 paragraphs with the names of drugs in Arabic, Greek, Syrian, Persian, Berber, and Spanish.

The Oath of Maimonides
The Oath of Maimonides is a document about the medical calling and recited as a substitute for the Hippocratic Oath. It is not to be confused with a more lengthy Prayer of Maimonides. These documents may not have been written by Maimonides, but later. The Prayer appeared first in print in 1793 and has been attributed to Markus Herz, a German physician, pupil of Immanuel Kant.

Treatise on logic
The Treatise on Logic has been printed 17 times, including editions in Latin (1527), German (1805, 1822, 1833, 1828), French (1936) by Moïse Ventura and in 1996 by Rémi Brague, and English (1938) by  Israel Efros, and in an abridged Hebrew form. The work illustrates the essentials of Aristotelian logic to be found in the teachings of the great Islamic philosophers such as Avicenna and, above all, Al-Farabi, "the Second Master," the "First Master" being Aristotle. In his work devoted to the Treatise, Rémi Brague stresses the fact that Al-Farabi is the only philosopher mentioned therein. This indicates a line of conduct for the reader, who must read the text keeping in mind Al-Farabi's works on logic. In the Hebrew versions, the Treatise is called The words of Logic which describes the bulk of the work. The author explains the technical meaning of the words used by logicians. The Treatise duly inventories the terms used by the logician and indicates what they refer to. The work proceeds rationally through a lexicon of philosophical terms to a summary of higher philosophical topics, in 14 chapters corresponding to Maimonides's birthdate of 14 Nissan. The number 14 recurs in many of Maimonides's works. Each chapter offers a cluster of associated notions. The meaning of the words is explained and illustrated with examples. At the end of each chapter, the author carefully draws up the list of words studied.

Until very recently, it was accepted that Maimonides wrote the Treatise on Logic in his twenties or even in his teen years. Herbert Davidson has raised questions about Maimonides's authorship of this short work (and of other short works traditionally attributed to Maimonides). He maintains that Maimonides was not the author at all, based on a report of two Arabic-language manuscripts, unavailable to Western investigators in Asia Minor. Rabbi Yosef Kafih maintained that it is by Maimonides and newly translated it to Hebrew (as ) from the Judeo-Arabic.

Philosophy

Through The Guide for the Perplexed (which was initially written in Arabic as ) and the philosophical introductions to sections of his commentaries on the Mishna, Maimonides exerted an important influence on the Scholastic philosophers, especially on Albertus Magnus, Thomas Aquinas and Duns Scotus. He was a Jewish Scholastic. Educated more by reading the works of Arab Muslim philosophers than by personal contact with Arabian teachers, he acquired an intimate acquaintance not only with Arab Muslim philosophy, but with the doctrines of Aristotle. Maimonides strove to reconcile Aristotelianism and science with the teachings of the Torah. In his Guide for the Perplexed, he often explains the function and purpose of the statutory provisions contained in the Torah against the backdrop of the historical conditions. Maimonides is said to have been influenced by Asaph the Jew, who was the first Hebrew medical writer, and has been under major influence by Al-Ghazali, a prominent Persian philosopher.The book was highly controversial in its day, and was banned by French rabbis, who burnt copies of the work in Montpellier.

Thirteen principles of faith

In his commentary on the Mishnah (tractate Sanhedrin, chapter 10), Maimonides formulates his "13 principles of faith"; and that these principles summarized what he viewed as the required beliefs of Judaism:
 The existence of God.
 God's unity and indivisibility into elements.
 God's spirituality and incorporeality.
 God's eternity.
 God alone should be the object of worship.
 Revelation through God's prophets.
 The preeminence of Moses among the prophets.
 That the entire Torah (both the Written and Oral law) are of Divine origin and were dictated to Moses by God on Mt. Sinai.
 The Torah given by Moses is permanent and will not be replaced or changed.
 God's awareness of all human actions and thoughts.
 Reward of righteousness and punishment of evil.
 The coming of the Jewish Messiah.
 The resurrection of the dead.

Maimonides is said to have compiled the principles from various Talmudic sources. These principles were controversial when first proposed, evoking criticism by Rabbis Hasdai Crescas and Joseph Albo, and were effectively ignored by much of the Jewish community for the next few centuries. However, these principles have become widely held and are considered to be the cardinal principles of faith for Orthodox Jews. Two poetic restatements of these principles ( and ) eventually became canonized in many editions of the Siddur (Jewish prayer book).

Theology

Maimonides equated the God of Abraham to what philosophers refer to as the Necessary Being. God is unique in the universe, and the Torah commands that one love and fear God (Deut 10:12) on account of that uniqueness. To Maimonides, this meant that one ought to contemplate God's works and to marvel at the order and wisdom that went into their creation. When one does this, one inevitably comes to love God and to sense how insignificant one is in comparison to God. This is the basis of the Torah.

The principle that inspired his philosophical activity was identical to a fundamental tenet of scholasticism: there can be no contradiction between the truths which God has revealed and the findings of the human mind in science and philosophy. Maimonides primarily relied upon the science of Aristotle and the teachings of the Talmud, commonly claiming to find a basis for the latter in the former.

Maimonides' admiration for the Neoplatonic commentators led him to doctrines which the later Scholastics did not accept. For instance, Maimonides was an adherent of apophatic theology. In this theology, one attempts to describe God through negative attributes. For instance, one should not say that God exists in the usual sense of the term; it can be said that God is not non-existent. One should not say that "God is wise"; but it can be said that "God is not ignorant," i.e., in some way, God has some properties of knowledge. One should not say that "God is One," but it can be stated that "there is no multiplicity in God's being." In brief, the attempt is to gain and express knowledge of God by describing what God is not, rather than by describing what God "is."

Maimonides argued adamantly that God is not corporeal. This was central to his thinking about the sin of idolatry. Maimonides insisted that all of the anthropomorphic phrases pertaining to God in sacred texts are to be interpreted metaphorically. A related tenet of Maimonidean theology is the notion that the commandments (especially those relates sacrifices) are intend to help wean the Israelites away from idolatry.

Maimonides also argued that God embodied reason, intellect, science, and nature, and was omnipotent and indescribable. He said that science, the growth of scientific fields, and discovery of the unknown by comprehension of nature was a way to appreciate God.

Character development

Maimonides taught about the developing of one's moral character. Although his life predated the modern concept of a personality, Maimonides believed that each person has an innate disposition along an ethical and emotional spectrum. Although one's disposition is often determined by factors outside of one's control, human beings have free will to choose to behave in ways that build character. He wrote, "One is obligated to conduct his affairs with others in a gentle and pleasing manner." Maimonides advised those with anti-social character traits ought to identify those traits and then make a conscious effort to behave in the opposite way. For example, an arrogant person should practice humility. If the circumstances of one's environment are such that it is impossible to behave ethically, one must move to a new location.

Prophecy
Maimonides agreed with "the Philosopher" (Aristotle) that the use of logic is the "right" way of thinking. He claimed that in order to understand how to know God, every human being must, by study, and meditation attain the degree of perfection required to reach the prophetic state. Despite his rationalistic approach, he does not explicitly reject the previous ideas (as portrayed, for example, by Rabbi Yehuda Halevi in ) that in order to become a prophet, God must intervene. Maimonides teaches that prophecy is the highest purpose of the most learned and refined individuals.

The problem of evil
Maimonides wrote on theodicy (the philosophical attempt to reconcile the existence of a God with the existence of evil). He took the premise that an omnipotent and good God exists. In The Guide for the Perplexed, Maimonides writes that all the evil that exists within human beings stems from their individual attributes, while all good comes from a universally shared humanity (Guide 3:8). He says that there are people who are guided by higher purpose, and there are those who are guided by physicality and must strive to find the higher purpose with which to guide their actions.

To justify the existence of evil, assuming God is both omnipotent and omnibenevolent, Maimonides postulates that one who created something by causing its opposite not to exist is not the same as creating something that exists; so evil is merely the absence of good. God did not create evil, rather God created good, and evil exists where good is absent (Guide 3:10). Therefore, all good is divine invention, and evil both is not and comes secondarily.

Maimonides contests the common view that evil outweighs good in the world. He says that if one were to examine existence only in terms of humanity, then that person may observe evil to dominate good, but if one looks at the whole of the universe, then he sees good is significantly more common than evil (Guide 3:12). Man, he reasons, is too insignificant a figure in God's myriad works to be their primary characterizing force, and so when people see mostly evil in their lives, they are not taking into account the extent of positive Creation outside of themselves.

Maimonides believes that there are three types of evil in the world: evil caused by nature, evil that people bring upon others, and evil man brings upon himself (Guide 3:12). The first type of evil Maimonides states is the rarest form, but arguably of the most necessary—the balance of life and death in both the human and animal worlds itself, he recognizes, is essential to God's plan. Maimonides writes that the second type of evil is relatively rare, and that humanity brings it upon itself. The third type of evil humans bring upon themselves and is the source of most of the ills of the world. These are the result of people's falling victim to their physical desires. To prevent the majority of evil which stems from harm one does to oneself, one must learn how to respond to one's bodily urges.

Skepticism of astrology

Maimonides answered an inquiry concerning astrology, addressed to him from Marseille. He responded that man should believe only what can be supported either by rational proof, by the evidence of the senses, or by trustworthy authority. He affirms that he had studied astrology, and that it does not deserve to be described as a science. He ridicules the concept that the fate of a man could be dependent upon the constellations; he argues that such a theory would rob life of purpose, and would make man a slave of destiny.

True beliefs versus necessary beliefs
In The Guide for the Perplexed Book III, Chapter 28, Maimonides draws a distinction between "true beliefs," which were beliefs about God that produced intellectual perfection, and "necessary beliefs," which were conducive to improving social order. Maimonides places anthropomorphic personification statements about God in the latter class. He uses as an example the notion that God becomes "angry" with people who do wrong. In the view of Maimonides (taken from Avicenna), God does not become angry with people, as God has no human passions; but it is important for them to believe God does, so that they desist from doing wrong.

Righteousness and charity 

Maimonides conceived of an eight-level hierarchy of tzedakah, where the highest form is to give a gift, loan, or partnership that will result in the recipient becoming self-sufficient instead of living upon others. In his view, the lowest form of tzedakah is to give begrudgingly. The eight levels are: 
 Giving begrudgingly
 Giving less than you should, but giving it cheerfully
 Giving after being asked
 Giving before being asked
 Giving when you do not know the recipient's identity, but the recipient knows your identity
 Giving when you know the recipient's identity, but the recipient doesn't know your identity
 Giving when neither party knows the other's identity
 Enabling the recipient to become self-reliant

Eschatology

The Messianic era
Perhaps one of Maimonides's most highly acclaimed and renowned writings is his treatise on the Messianic era, written originally in Judeo-Arabic and which he elaborates on in great detail in his Commentary on the Mishnah (Introduction to the 10th chapter of tractate Sanhedrin, also known as ).

Resurrection

Religious Jews believed in immortality in a spiritual sense, and most believed that the future would include a messianic era and a resurrection of the dead. This is the subject of Jewish eschatology. Maimonides wrote much on this topic, but in most cases he wrote about the immortality of the soul for people of perfected intellect; his writings were usually  about the resurrection of dead bodies. Rabbis of his day were critical of this aspect of this thought, and there was controversy over his true views.

Eventually, Maimonides felt pressured to write a treatise on the subject, known as "The Treatise on Resurrection." In it, he wrote that those who claimed that he believed the verses of the Hebrew Bible referring to the resurrection were only allegorical were spreading falsehoods. Maimonides asserts that belief in resurrection is a fundamental truth of Judaism about which there is no disagreement.

While his position on the World to Come (non-corporeal eternal life as described above) may be seen as being in contradiction with his position on bodily resurrection, Maimonides resolved them with a then unique solution: Maimonides believed that the resurrection was not permanent or general. In his view, God never violates the laws of nature. Rather, divine interaction is by way of angels, whom Maimonides often regards to be metaphors for the laws of nature, the principles by which the physical universe operates, or Platonic eternal forms. Thus, if a unique event actually occurs, even if it is perceived as a miracle, it is not a violation of the world's order.

In this view, any dead who are resurrected must eventually die again. In his discussion of the 13 principles of faith, the first five deal with knowledge of God, the next four deal with prophecy and the Torah, while the last four deal with reward, punishment and the ultimate redemption. In this discussion Maimonides says nothing of a universal resurrection. All he says it is that whatever resurrection does take place, it will occur at an indeterminate time before the world to come, which he repeatedly states will be purely spiritual.

The World to Come
Maimonides distinguishes two kinds of intelligence in man, the one material in the sense of being dependent on, and influenced by, the body, and the other immaterial, that is, independent of the bodily organism. It is acquired as the result of the efforts of the soul to attain a correct knowledge of the absolute, pure intelligence of God.

The knowledge of God is a form of knowledge which develops in us the immaterial intelligence, and thus confers on man an immaterial, spiritual nature. This confers on the soul that perfection in which human happiness consists, and endows the soul with immortality. One who has attained a correct knowledge of God has reached a condition of existence, which renders him immune from all the accidents of fortune, from all the allurements of sin, and from death itself. Man is in a position to work out his own salvation and his immortality.

Baruch Spinoza's doctrine of immortality was strikingly similar. However, Spinoza teaches that the way to attain the knowledge which confers immortality is the progress from sense-knowledge through scientific knowledge to philosophical intuition of all things , while Maimonides holds that the road to perfection and immortality is the path of duty as described in the Torah and the rabbinic understanding of the oral law.

Maimonides describes the world to come as the stage after a person lives their life in this world as well as the final state of existence after the Messianic Era. Some time after the resurrection of the dead, souls will live forever without bodies. They will enjoy the radiance of the Divine Presence without the need for food, drink or sexual pleasures.

Maimonides and Kabbalah
Maimonides was not known as a supporter of Kabbalah, although a strong intellectual type of mysticism has been discerned in his philosophy. In The Guide for the Perplexed, Maimonides declares his intention to conceal from the average reader his explanations of  esoteric meanings of Torah. The nature of these "secrets" is debated. Religious Jewish rationalists, and the mainstream academic view, read Maimonides' Aristotelianism as a mutually-exclusive alternative metaphysics to Kabbalah. Some academics hold that Maimonides' project fought against the Proto-Kabbalah of his time. However, many Kabbalists and their heirs read Maimonides according to Kabbalah or as an actual covert subscriber to Kabbalah, due to the similarities between the Kabbalistic approach and Maimonides' approach toward interpreting the Bible with metaphor, Maimonides' understanding of God through attributes of action, thought and negative attributes, Maimonides' description of the roles of the imagination and intellect in life, sin, and prophesy, Maimonides' assertion that the commandments have a function that can be understood, and Maimonides' description of a 3-tiered cosmic order whereby God's will is implemented through a system of angels. According to this, he employed rationalism to defend Judaism rather than limit inquiry of  only to rationalism. His rationalism, if not taken as an opposition, also assisted the Kabbalists, purifying their transmitted teaching from mistaken corporeal interpretations that could have been made from Hekhalot literature, though Kabbalists held that their theosophy alone allowed human access to Divine mysteries.

Other views 
Maimonides expressed disapproval of poetry, the best of which he declared to be false (since it was founded on pure invention), and which he considered to be a waste of time, and conducive to linguistic ambiguity and thus intellectual error.

In The Guide for the Perplexed, Maimonides proposes that two purposes of circumcision are to temper sexual desire and to join in an affirmation of faith and the covenant of Abraham.

Influence and legacy

Maimonides'  is considered by Jews even today as one of the chief authoritative codifications of Jewish law and ethics. It is exceptional for its logical construction, concise and clear expression and extraordinary learning, so that it became a standard against which other later codifications were often measured. It is still closely studied in rabbinic  (seminaries). The first to compile a comprehensive lexicon containing an alphabetically arranged list of difficult words found in Maimonides'  was Tanḥum ha-Yerushalmi (1220–1291). A popular medieval saying that also served as his epitaph states, "From Mosheh [of the Torah] to Mosheh [Maimonides] there was none like Mosheh." It chiefly referred to his rabbinic writings.

However, Maimonides was also one of the most influential figures in medieval Jewish philosophy. His  adaptation of Aristotelian thought to Biblical faith deeply impressed later Jewish thinkers, and had an unexpected immediate historical impact. Some more acculturated Jews in the century that followed his death, particularly in Spain, sought to apply Maimonides's Aristotelianism in ways that undercut traditionalist belief and observance, giving rise to an intellectual controversy in Spanish and southern French Jewish circles. The intensity of debate spurred Catholic Church interventions against "heresy" and a general confiscation of rabbinic texts. In reaction, the more radical interpretations of Maimonides were defeated. At least amongst Ashkenazi Jews, there was a tendency to ignore his specifically philosophical writings and to stress instead the rabbinic and halakhic writings. These writings often included considerable philosophical chapters or discussions in support of halakhic observance; David Hartman observes that Maimonides clearly expressed "the traditional support for a philosophical understanding of God both in the Aggadah of Talmud and in the behavior of the hasid [the pious Jew]." Maimonidean thought continues to influence traditionally observant Jews.

The most rigorous medieval critique of Maimonides is Hasdai Crescas's . Crescas bucked the eclectic trend, by demolishing the certainty of the Aristotelian world-view, not only in religious matters but also in the most basic areas of medieval science (such as physics and geometry). Crescas's critique provoked a number of 15th-century scholars to write defenses of Maimonides.

Because of his path-finding synthesis of Aristotle and Biblical faith, Maimonides had an influence on the great Christian theologian Saint Thomas Aquinas who refers to Maimonides in several of his works, including the Commentary on the Sentences.

Maimonides's combined abilities in the fields of theology, philosophy and medicine make his work attractive today as a source during discussions of evolving norms in these fields, particularly medicine. An example is the modern citation of his method of determining death of the body in the controversy regarding declaration of death to permit organ donation for transplantation.

Maimonides and the Modernists

Maimonides remains one of the most widely debated Jewish thinkers among modern scholars. He has been adopted as a symbol and an intellectual hero by almost all major movements in modern Judaism, and has proven important to philosophers such as Leo Strauss; and his views on the importance of humility have been taken up by modern humanist philosophers.

In academia, particularly within the area of Jewish Studies, the teaching of Maimonides has been dominated by traditional scholars, generally Orthodox, who place a very strong emphasis on Maimonides as a rationalist; one result is that certain sides of Maimonides's thought, including his opposition to anthropocentrism, have been obviated. There are movements in some postmodern circles to claim Maimonides for other purposes, as within the discourse of ecotheology. Maimonides's reconciliation of the philosophical and the traditional has given his legacy an extremely diverse and dynamic quality.

Tributes and memorials

Maimonides has been memorialized in numerous ways. For example, one of the Learning Communities at the Tufts University School of Medicine bears his name. There is also Maimonides School in Brookline, Massachusetts, Maimonides Academy School in Los Angeles, California, Lycée Maïmonide in Casablanca, the Brauser Maimonides Academy in Hollywood, Florida, and Maimonides Medical Center in Brooklyn, New York. Beit Harambam Congregation, a Sephardi synagogue in Philadelphia, Pennsylvania, is named after him.

Issued from 8 May 1986 to 1995, the Series A of the Israeli New Shekel featured an illustration of Maimonides on the obverse and the place of his burial in Tiberias on the reverse on its 1-shekel bill.

In 2004, conferences were held at Yale, Florida International University, Penn State, and the Rambam Hospital in Haifa, Israel, which is named after him. To commemorate the 800th anniversary of his death, Harvard University issued a memorial volume. In 1953, the Israel Postal Authority issued a postage stamp of Maimonides, pictured.

In March 2008, during the Euromed Conference of Ministers of Tourism, The Tourism Ministries of Israel, Morocco and Spain agreed to work together on a joint project that will trace the footsteps of the Rambam and thus boost religious tourism in the cities of Córdoba, Fes and Tiberias.

Between December 2018 and January 2019 the Israel Museum held a special exhibit dedicated to the writings of Maimonides.

Burial place
He is buried in HaRambam compound / complex in Tiberias / Tveria.

Other notable rabbis also buried in HaRambam compound / complex:
 Shelah HaKadosh
 Eliezer ben Hurcanus
 Yohanan ben Zakkai
 Joshua ben Hananiah

See also
 Averroes
  (Epistle to Yemen)
 Maimonides Foundation
 Mimouna

Notes

References

Bibliography

 
 
 
 
 
 
 
 
 
 
 
 
  Originally published by the Jewish Publication of America, Philadelphia.
 
 
 
 
  See especially chapters 10 through 15.

  (Volume 5 translated by Uriel Barzel; foreword by Fred Rosner.)
 
 
 
  See chapters 5 through 8.
 
  reprint

Further reading
 Maimonides: Abū ʿImrān Mūsā [Moses] ibn ʿUbayd Allāh [Maymūn] al‐Qurṭubī www.islamsci.mcgill.ca

External links

About Maimonides
 Maimonides entry in the Jewish Encyclopedia (1906)
 Maimonides entry in the Encyclopædia Britannica
 Maimonides entry in the Encyclopaedia Judaica, 2nd edition (2007)
 
 "Maimonides entry in the Internet Encyclopedia of Philosophy"
 Video lecture on Maimonides by Dr. Henry Abramson
 Maimonides, a biography — book by David Yellin and Israel Abrahams
 Maimonides as a Philosopher
 The Influence of Islamic Thought on Maimonides
 "The Moses of Cairo," Article from Policy Review
 Rambam and the Earth: Maimonides as a Proto-Ecological Thinker – reprint on neohasid.org from The Encyclopedia of Religion and Ecology
 Anti-Maimonidean Demons  by Jose Faur, describing the controversy surrounding Maimonides's works
 David Yellin and Israel Abrahams, Maimonides (1903) (full text of a biography)
  (PDF version)
 Maimonides at intellectualencounters.org
 
 
The Guide: An Explanatory Commentary on Each Chapter of Maimonides' Guide of The Perplexed by Scott Michael Alexander (covers all of Book I, currently)

Maimonides's works
 Complete Mishneh Torah online, halakhic work of Maimonides
 Sefer Hamitzvot, English translation
 Oral Readings of Mishne Torah  — Free listening and Download, site also had classes in Maimonides's Iggereth Teiman
 Maimonides 13 Principles 
 Intellectual Encounters – Main Thinkers – Moses Maimonides, in intellectualencounters.org
 Maimonides, Mishneh Torah, Autograph Draft , Egypt,  1180
 British Library – Autograph responsum of Moses Maimonides, pre-eminent Jewish polymath and spiritual leader, Ilana Tahan
 Digitized works by Maimonides at the Leo Baeck Institute

Texts by Maimonides
 Siddur Mesorath Moshe, a prayerbook based on the early Jewish liturgy as found in Maimonides's Mishne Tora
 Rambam's introduction to the Mishneh Torah (English translation)
 Rambam's introduction to the Commentary on the Mishnah (Hebrew language|Hebrew Fulltext)
 The Guide For the Perplexed by Moses Maimonides translated into English by Michael Friedländer
 Writings of Maimonides; manuscripts and early print editions. Jewish National and University Library
 Facsimile edition of Moreh Nevukhim/The Guide for the Perplexed (illuminated Hebrew manuscript, Barcelona, 1347–48). The Royal Library, Copenhagen 
 University of Cambridge Library collection  of Judeo-Arabic letters and manuscripts written by or to Maimonides. It includes the last letter his brother David sent him before drowning at sea.
 A. Ashur, A newly discovered medical recipe written by Maimonides 
 M.A Friedman and A. Ashur, A newly-discovered autograph responsum of Maimonides 

 
1130s births
1204 deaths
12th-century Arabic writers
12th-century Jewish theologians
12th-century Egyptian physicians
12th-century philosophers
13th-century philosophers
Aristotelian philosophers
Authors of books on Jewish law
Commentaries on the Mishnah
Court physicians
Exponents of Jewish law
Jewish astronomers
Jewish ethicists
Jewish refugees
Jews and Judaism in the Kingdom of Jerusalem
Judeo-Arabic writers
Medieval Jewish astronomers
Medieval Jewish physicians of Spain
Medieval Jewish physicians of Egypt
Rabbis from Córdoba, Spain
Philosophers from al-Andalus
Philosophers of Judaism
Sephardi rabbis
University of al-Qarawiyyin alumni
Physicians from the Ayyubid Sultanate
Holy Land travellers
Medieval Jewish scholars